Alexis Paumier Frómeta (born 21 January 1975 in Baracoa, Guantánamo) is a Cuban shot putter. His personal best throw is 20.78 metres, achieved in July 2000 in Havana.

Career
He won the silver medals at the 2001 and 2005 Central American and Caribbean Championships and the 2006 Central American and Caribbean Games. He also competed at the Olympic Games in 2000 and 2008 without reaching the final.

Personal best
Shot put: 20.78 m –  La Habana, 29 July 2000
Discus throw: 53.80 –  La Habana, 15 April 2003

Competition record

References

External links
 
 Sports reference biography

1975 births
Living people
Cuban male shot putters
Athletes (track and field) at the 2000 Summer Olympics
Athletes (track and field) at the 2008 Summer Olympics
Olympic athletes of Cuba
Athletes (track and field) at the 2003 Pan American Games
Athletes (track and field) at the 2007 Pan American Games
Pan American Games competitors for Cuba
Central American and Caribbean Games gold medalists for Cuba
Competitors at the 2006 Central American and Caribbean Games
Central American and Caribbean Games medalists in athletics
People from Baracoa
20th-century Cuban people
21st-century Cuban people